Gerald Allen Lynn (May 28, 1952 – September 6, 2020) was an American politician who served as the Judge-Executive of Meade County, Kentucky from 2011 to 2020. He previously served in the Kentucky House of Representatives from the 27th district from 2005 to 2007.

Lynn served in the Kentucky National Guard. He was a general contractor and building inspector. Lynn was the owner of Lunn's Pins Bowling Center in Brandenburg, Kentucky.

He died on September 6, 2020, in Brandenburg, Kentucky, at age 68.

References

1952 births
2020 deaths
People from Brandenburg, Kentucky
Kentucky National Guard personnel
Businesspeople from Kentucky
Republican Party members of the Kentucky House of Representatives
County judges in Kentucky